Topobea is a genus of flowering plants in the family Melastomataceae. A 2013 study indicated that it is actually part of the genus Blakea.

Species include:
 Topobea asplundii Wurdack
 Topobea brevibractea Gleason
 Topobea cutucuensis Wurdack
 Topobea eplingii Wurdack
 Topobea induta Markgr.
 Topobea macbrydei Wurdack
 Topobea maguirei Wurdack
 Topobea parvifolia (Gleason) Almeda
 Topobea pascoensis Wurdack
 Topobea toachiensis Wurdack
 Topobea verrucosa Wurdack

References

 
Melastomataceae genera
Taxonomy articles created by Polbot